Buckskin Gulch (also known as Buckskin Creek, Buckskin Wash, and Kaibab Gulch) is a gulch and canyon located within southern Kane County, Utah, United States.

Buckskin Gulch is the longest and deepest slot canyon in the Southwestern United States.

Wire Pass, a short tributary to Buckskin, is a popular day-hiking alternative that takes hikers through the narrow, curving features which are the hallmarks of the slot canyons.

Access 
Buckskin Gulch is reached via U. S. Route 89 (US‑89) in Utah or U. S. Route 89 A (US  89 A) in Arizona, and is roughly halfway between the towns of Kanab, Utah and Page, Arizona. There are four access routes to the canyon. There is a $6 per person access fee, which can be paid online ahead of time or on-site through a cash/check drop box.

Buckskin Trailhead 
No restrooms are available at this trailhead.

Wire Pass Trailhead 
This entrance is more popular than the other three as it provides the quickest access to the best parts of Buckskin Gulch and because it is the same trailhead used to access the Coyote Buttes, home to The Wave, a famous sandstone rock formation. (Access to The Wave requires a special, separate permit.)

White House Trailhead 
Restrooms are available at this trailhead.

Lee's Ferry 
In addition to the more direct routes to Buckskin Gulch, it can also be reached through Paria Canyon/Paria River at the Lee's Ferry. Restrooms and water are available at this trailhead.

Regulations 
Permits are required for overnight backpacking as well as day hiking in Buckskin Gulch and the Paria Canyon-Vermilion Cliffs Wilderness. Permits can be obtained from the Bureau of Land Management (BLM) online. Only twenty overnight permits per day are allowed, and group sizes are limited to ten persons. The overnight fee is $5.00 per person per day, while day-use permits are $6.00 per person per day. There is also a $6.00 fee per dog per day. Due to the canyon's popularity, permits typically sell out several months in advance. Campfires are prohibited, and human waste cannot be buried and must be packed out in order to preserve the pristine condition of the area.

See also 

 List of rivers of Utah
 Antelope Canyon

References

External links 

 Paria Canyon-Vermillion Cliffs Wilderness
 Buckskin Gulch at climb-Utah.com, a detailed description of the hike from Wire Pass, with GPS waypoints
 Buckskin Gulch GPS map Buckskin Gulch at Wikiloc.com. See the trail on Google Maps and Google Earth.

Rivers of Utah
Slot canyons
Canyons and gorges of Utah
Rivers of Kane County, Utah
Tributaries of the Colorado River in Utah
Bureau of Land Management areas in Utah
Protected areas of Kane County, Utah